Lachlan "Lachie" Jones is an Australian rules footballer who plays for Port Adelaide in the Australian Football League (AFL).

Jones played in Woodville-West Torrens' SANFL premiership side in 2020.

He was a member of Port Adelaide's Next Generation Academy. He was eligible through being indigenous and hailing from Bute, on South Australia's Yorke Peninsula.

He made his AFL debut in Round 4 of the 2021 AFL season against  at Adelaide Oval.

References

External links

2002 births
Living people
Indigenous Australian players of Australian rules football
Port Adelaide Football Club players
Port Adelaide Football Club players (all competitions)
Australian rules footballers from South Australia
Woodville-West Torrens Football Club players